Sokółka  is a settlement in the administrative district of Gmina Pasłęk, within Elbląg County, Warmian-Masurian Voivodeship, in northern Poland.

History
In the past, the village was at various times part of Poland, Prussia and Germany, before it became again part of Poland following Germany's defeat in World War II in 1945.

References

Villages in Elbląg County